This is a list of the National Register of Historic Places listings in Maverick County, Texas.

This is intended to be a complete list of properties and districts listed on the National Register of Historic Places in Maverick County, Texas. There are one district and one individual property listed on the National Register in the county. Both are State Antiquities Landmark while the individual property is also a Recorded Texas Historic Landmark. The district includes one Recorded Texas Historic Landmark within its boundary.

Current listings

The locations of National Register properties and districts may be seen in a mapping service provided.

|}

See also

National Register of Historic Places listings in Texas
Recorded Texas Historic Landmarks in Maverick County

References

External links

Maverick County, Texas
Maverick County
Buildings and structures in Maverick County, Texas